Il Microfono è vostro is a 1951 Italian comedy film directed by Giuseppe Bennati.

Plot

Cast
 Aroldo Tieri
 Gisella Sofio
 Enrico Viarisio
 Guglielmo Inglese
 Enrico Luzi
 Ada Dondini
 Mario Siletti
 Rino Salviati
 Franco Pucci
 Nilla Pizzi
 Nunzio Filogamo
 Gorni Kramer
 Cinico Angelini
 Gisella Monaldi
 Giacomo Furia
 Quartetto Cetra

External links
 

1951 films
1950s Italian-language films
Italian comedy films
1951 comedy films
Italian black-and-white films
1950s Italian films